A moccasin is a form of shoe worn by Native Americans, and by hunters, traders, and settlers in the frontier regions of North America.

Moccasin may also refer to:

 Moccasin (horse), an American Thoroughbred racehorse

Places 
 Moccasin, Arizona
 Moccasin, Tuolumne County, California
 Moccasin, Illinois
 Moccasin, Montana
 Moccasin Bend, a location near Chattanooga, Tennessee, in the United States
 Moccasin Mountains, a range at the Arizona-Utah border
 Moccasin Township, Effingham County, Illinois

Plants
 Lady's slipper, an orchid, called the moccasin flower in the United States

Ships
 , a tug in commission from 1864 to 1865 that was assigned to the North Atlantic Blockading Squadron during the American Civil War
 , a Plunger-class submarine in commission from 1903 to 1919
 , a refrigerated cargo ship in commission from 1918 to 1919
 ,  a Revenue Cutter purchased from the U.S. Navy in 1865

Snakes
 Any member of the genus Gloydius, also known as Asian moccasins, a group of venomous pit vipers found in Asia
 Any member of the genus Agkistrodon, a group of venomous pit vipers found in North and Central America
 Deinagkistrodon acutus, also known as the Chinese moccasin, a venomous pit viper species found in China and Southeast Asia
 Calloselasma rhodostoma, also known as the Malayan moccasin, a venomous ground pit viper species found in Southeast Asia including Indonesia
 Heterodon platirhinos, also known as the eastern hog-nosed snake, a non-venomous colubrid species found in North America

See also 
 

Animal common name disambiguation pages